The following is a list of paintings by Rembrandt in order of appearance (catalogue numbers 1–265), that were attributed as autograph by Christian Tümpel in 1986.

See also
List of paintings by Rembrandt (an updated list of attributions based on recent work by the Rembrandt Research Project)

Sources

 Rembrandt, by Christian and Astrid Tümpel, H.J.W. Becht, Amsterdam, 1986, 

 
Rembrandt Paintings
Rembrandt
Rembrandt studies